Amanita breckonii is a species of agaric fungus in the genus Amanita. It is known from California and Washington, where it associates with Monterey pine, ponderosa pine, and spruce. The species was described as new to science in 1982 by mycologists Harry Delbert Thiers and Joseph Ammirati. The holotype specimen was collected in 1966 on the campus of San Francisco State University by then graduate student Gary Breckon, for whom the species is named.

See also

List of Amanita species

References

External links

breckonii
Fungi of California
Fungi described in 1982
Fungi without expected TNC conservation status